The 1993 Toledo Rockets football team was an American football team that represented the University of Toledo in the Mid-American Conference (MAC) during the 1993 NCAA Division I-A football season. In their third season under head coach Gary Pinkel, the Rockets compiled a 4–7 record (3–5 against MAC opponents), finished in a tie for seventh place in the MAC, and were outscored by all opponents by a combined total of 270 to 252.

The team's statistical leaders included Tim Kubiak with 970 passing yards, Wasean Tait with 656 rushing yards, and Scott Brunswick with 571 receiving yards.

Schedule

References

Toledo
Toledo Rockets football seasons
Toledo Rockets football